Sulagna Panigrahi is an Indian television and film actress. As a débutante, she played the lead role in the television serial Amber Dhara as Dhara, and went on to play the principal character in Do Saheliyaan. She further did a grey role as Sakshi Rajvansh in Bidaai, until getting her big break in the Bhatt banner film Murder 2 as Reshma. She married stand-up comedian Biswa Kalyan Rath on 9 December 2020. She is playing the lead role in StarPlus historical drama, titled Vidrohi .

Career
Panigrahi made her television debut with the show Amber Dhara, where she played the character of Dhara, based on a story of conjoined twins. The series aired on Sony Entertainment Television from September 2007 to March 2008. Her second show was Do Saheliyaan, where she played the role of Maithali, based on the story of best friends set in rural Rajasthan. Do Saheliyaan aired on Zee TV from March 2010 to July 2010. After this, she went on to do a negative role in the serial Bidaai, playing the role of Sakshi.

She made her Bollywood debut in the 2011 thriller Murder 2, a sequel to the 2004 hit Murder, under the banner of Vishesh Films. She played the role of Reshma, a poor college student, who in need of money for her family to survive, chooses to become a part-time prostitute and falls victim to a psychopathic serial killer. Her role was well-received with positive reviews from critics around the media. After Murder 2, she has done independent and content driven Hindi films with strong performances like Rave, starring Rajkumar Rao and Divyendu Sharma and Gurudakshina, with Girish Karnad and Rupa Ganguly. Recently, she was seen in the movie Raid, starring Ajay Devgn, in which she played the role of a girl Tara, who was the main informer of the income tax officer played by Ajay Devgn. She starred in Marathi with the romantic film Ishq Wala Love, where she was paired opposite Adinath Kothare. Apart from starring in the film, she also did the full costume styling for her character herself. Her performance was appreciated by the critics and audience alike, specially complimenting the chemistry between the two actors. One of her most awaited projects is the Tamil film Isai, directed, produced and performed by S. J. Suryah. This will be her debut film in Tamil and will also mark the comeback of S. J. Suryah as a director in Tamil film industry after almost 9 years, at present she is working in a video series Married Woman Diaries Part 2.

Sulagna was featured as top six finalists in the category of "Indian Affairs Most Promising & Emerging Actress of the Year 2018" at 2018 India Leadership Conclave Awards Founded by Satya Brahma.

Filmography

Television

Web series

Awards and nominations

References

External links

 

Living people
Actresses from Odisha
Indian film actresses
Actresses in Hindi cinema
Indian television actresses
People from Brahmapur
Actresses in Marathi cinema
Actresses in Tamil cinema
Actresses in Hindi television
21st-century Indian actresses
1987 births